Radoy Ralin Peak is a 720 m peak in the Levski Ridge in Tangra Mountains on Livingston Island in the South Shetland Islands, Antarctica surmounting Iskar Glacier to the east and the Huron Glacier terminus to the north-northwest. It was named after the Bulgarian writer Dimitar Stoyanov, who used Radoy Ralin as a pseudonym.

Location

Maps
 L.L. Ivanov et al. Antarctica: Livingston Island and Greenwich Island, South Shetland Islands. Scale 1:100000 topographic map. Sofia: Antarctic Place-names Commission of Bulgaria, 2005.
 L.L. Ivanov. Antarctica: Livingston Island and Greenwich, Robert, Snow and Smith Islands. Scale 1:120000 topographic map.  Troyan: Manfred Wörner Foundation, 2009.  
 Antarctic Digital Database (ADD). Scale 1:250000 topographic map of Antarctica. Scientific Committee on Antarctic Research (SCAR). Since 1993, regularly upgraded and updated.
 L.L. Ivanov. Antarctica: Livingston Island and Smith Island. Scale 1:100000 topographic map. Manfred Wörner Foundation, 2017.

References
 
 Bulgarian Antarctic Gazetteer. Antarctic Place-names Commission. (details in Bulgarian, basic data in English)

External links
 Radoy Ralin Peak. Copernix satellite image

Mountains of Livingston Island